The Germany women's junior national handball team is the national under-19 handball team of Germany. Controlled by the German Handball Association it represents the country in international matches.

History

World Championship
 Champions   Runners up   Third place   Fourth place

 West Germany represent its inheritor between 1977 – 1989

European Championship
 Champions   Runners up   Third place   Fourth place

References

External links

Women's handball in Germany
Women's national junior handball teams
Handball